The Call of Courage is a 1925 American silent Western film directed by Clifford Smith and written by Harold Shumate. The film stars Art Acord, Olive Hasbrouck, Duke R. Lee, Frank Rice, John T. Prince, and Turner Savage. The film was released on December 22, 1925, by Universal Pictures.

Cast

References

External links
 
 

1925 films
1925 Western (genre) films
Universal Pictures films
Films directed by Clifford Smith
American black-and-white films
Silent American Western (genre) films
1920s English-language films
1920s American films